The 1990 WCHA Men's Ice Hockey Tournament was the 31st conference playoff in league history and 38th season where a WCHA champion was crowned. The tournament was played between March 1 and March 12, 1990. First round games were played at home team campus sites while all 'Final Four' matches were held at the Civic Center in St. Paul, Minnesota. By winning the tournament, Wisconsin was awarded the Broadmoor Trophy and received the WCHA's automatic bid to the 1990 NCAA Division I Men's Ice Hockey Tournament.

Format
The first round of the postseason tournament featured a best-of-three games format. Teams were seeded No. 1 through No. 8 according to their final conference standing, with a tiebreaker system used to seed teams with an identical number of points accumulated. The top four seeded teams each earned home ice and hosted one of the lower seeded teams.

The winners of the first round series advanced to the semifinal and championship rounds held at the Civic Center. All Final Four games used a single-elimination format. Teams were re-seeded No. 1 through No. 4 according to the final regular season conference standings, with the top remaining seed matched against lowest remaining seed in one semifinal game while the two other semifinalists meeting with the winners advancing to the championship game and the losers competing in a Third Place contest. The Tournament Champion received an automatic bid to the 1990 NCAA Division I Men's Ice Hockey Tournament.

Conference standings
Note: GP = Games played; W = Wins; L = Losses; T = Ties; PTS = Points; GF = Goals For; GA = Goals Against

Bracket
Teams are reseeded after the first round

Note: * denotes overtime period(s)

First round

(1) Wisconsin vs. (8) Michigan Tech

(2) Minnesota vs. (7) Colorado College

(3) North Dakota vs. (6) Minnesota-Duluth

(4) Northern Michigan vs. (5) Denver

Semifinals

(1) Wisconsin vs. (4) Northern Michigan

(2) Minnesota vs. (3) North Dakota

Third Place

(3) North Dakota vs. (4) Northern Michigan

Championship

(1) Wisconsin vs. (2) Minnesota

Tournament awards

All-Tournament Team
F Ken Gernander (Minnesota)
F Greg Johnson (North Dakota)
F Russ Romaniuk (North Dakota)
D Jason Herter (North Dakota)
D Sean Hill (Wisconsin)
G Duane Derksen (Wisconsin)

MVP
Steve Rohlik (Wisconsin)

See also
Western Collegiate Hockey Association men's champions

References

External links
WCHA.com
1989–90 WCHA Standings
1989–90 NCAA Standings
2013–14 Colorado College Tigers Media Guide
2013–14 Denver Pioneers Media Guide
2013–14 Minnesota Golden Gophers Media Guide 
2012–13 Minnesota-Duluth Bulldogs Media Guide
2013–14 North Dakota Hockey Media Guide
2006–07 Northern Michigan Wildcats Media Guide
2003–04 Wisconsin Badgers Media Guide

WCHA Men's Ice Hockey Tournament
Wcha Men's Ice Hockey Tournament